The DUKW (colloquially known as Duck) is a six-wheel-drive amphibious modification of the -ton CCKW trucks used by the U.S. military during World War II and the Korean War.

Designed by a partnership under military auspices of Sparkman & Stephens and General Motors Corporation (GMC), the DUKW was used for the transportation of goods and troops over land and water. Excelling at approaching and crossing beaches in amphibious warfare attacks, it was intended only to last long enough to meet the demands of combat. Surviving DUKWs have since found popularity as tourist craft in marine environments.

Etymology
The name DUKW comes from General Motors Corporation model nomenclature:

 D, 1942 production series
 U, Utility
 K, all wheel drive
 W, tandem rear axles, both driven

Decades later, the designation was explained erroneously by writers such as Donald Clarke, who wrote in 1978 that it was an initialism for "Duplex Universal Karrier, Wheeled".

The U.S. Navy-Marine Corps alternative designation of LVW (Landing Vehicle, Wheeled) was seldom used.

History
The DUKW was designed by Rod Stephens Jr. of Sparkman & Stephens, Inc. yacht designers, Dennis Puleston, a British deep-water sailor resident in the U.S., and Frank W. Speir from the Massachusetts Institute of Technology. Developed by the National Defense Research Committee and the Office of Scientific Research and Development to solve the problem of resupply to units which had just performed an amphibious landing, it was initially rejected by the armed services. When a United States Coast Guard patrol craft ran aground on a sand bar near Provincetown, Massachusetts, an experimental DUKW happened to be in the area for a demonstration. The DUKW later proved its seaworthiness by crossing the English Channel.

The final production design was perfected by a few engineers at Yellow Truck & Coach in Pontiac, Michigan. The vehicle was built by Yellow Truck and Coach Co. (GMC Truck and Coach Div. after 1943) at their Pontiac West Assembly Plant and Chevrolet Div. of General Motors Corp. at their St. Louis Truck Assembly Plant; 21,147 were manufactured before production ended in 1945.

Description

The DUKW was built around the GMC AFKWX, a cab-over-engine (COE) version of the GMC CCKW six-wheel-drive military truck, with the addition of a watertight hull and a propeller. It was powered by a  GMC Model 270 straight-six engine. A five-speed overdrive transmission drove a transfer case for the propeller, then a two-speed transfer case to drive the axles. The propeller and front axle were selectable from their transfer case. A power take-off on the transmission drove an air-compressor and winch.

One in four DUKWs mounted a  Browning heavy machine gun on a ring mount.

The DUKW was the first vehicle to allow the driver to vary the tire pressure from inside the cab. The tires could be fully inflated for hard surfaces such as roads and less inflated for softer surfaces, especially beach sand. This added to its versatility as an amphibious vehicle. This feature is now standard on many military vehicles.

Service history

World War II 

The DUKW was supplied to the U.S. Army, U.S. Marine Corps and Allied forces, and 2,000 were supplied to Britain under the Lend-Lease program;  535 were acquired by Australian forces, and 586 were supplied to the Soviet Union, which built its own version, the BAV 485, after the war. 
DUKWs were initially sent to Guadalcanal in the Pacific theater, but were used by an invasion force for the first time in the European theater, during the Sicilian invasion, Operation Husky, in the Mediterranean.

They were used on the D-Day beaches of Normandy and in the Battle of the Scheldt, Operation Veritable, and Operation Plunder.

In the Pacific, USMC DUKWs were used to cross the coral reefs of islands such as Saipan and Guam and the tires were not affected by the coral.

Some DUKWs used in WW2 were reported to have capsized while landing at Omaha beach during the Normandy invasion.

DUKWs were also used in Lake Garda in Italy by the 10th Mountain Division in the final days of the war. One sank crossing from Torbole sul Garda to Riva del Garda on the evening of 30 April 1945; 25 out of the 26 onboard died. Two other DUKWs sank without casualties.

After the war
After World War II, reduced numbers were kept in service by the United States, Britain, France, and Australia, with many stored pending disposal. Australia transferred many to Citizens Military Force units.

The U.S. Army reactivated and deployed several hundred at the outbreak of the Korean War with the 1st Transportation Replacement Training Group providing crew training. DUKWs were used extensively to bring supplies ashore during the Battle of Pusan Perimeter and in the amphibious landings at Incheon.

Ex-U.S. Army DUKWs were transferred to the French military after World War II and were used by the Troupes de marine and naval commandos. Many were used for general utility duties in overseas territories. France deployed DUKWs to French Indochina during the First Indochina War. Some French DUKWs were given new hulls in the 1970s, with the last being retired in 1982.

Britain deployed DUKWs to Malaya during the Malayan Emergency of 1948–60. Many were redeployed to Borneo during the Indonesia–Malaysia confrontation of 1962–66.

Later military use
The Royal Marines used five of these vehicles for training at 11 (Amphibious Trials and Training) Squadron, 1 Assault Group Royal Marines at Instow, North Devon. Four were manufactured between 1943 and 1945. The fifth is a DUKW hull copy manufactured in 1993 with unused World War II-vintage running gear parts. In 1999, a refurbishment programme began to extend their service life to 2014. DUKWs were removed from service in 2012.

The DUKWs were used for safety, allowing all ranks to undertake training drills for boat work for the landing craft ranks, and drivers undertaking wading drills from the Landing Craft Utility.

Principal military users

 United States
 Australia – 535
 Brazil
 Canada – about 800
 Dominican Republic
 France
 Philippines
 Iraq
 Soviet Union – 586
 United Kingdom – about 2,000

Developments

In the latter 1940s and throughout the 1950s, while Speir, now project engineer for the Army's Amphibious Warfare Program, worked on "bigger and better" amphibious vehicles such as the "Super Duck", the "Drake", and the mammoth BARC (Barge, Amphibious, Resupply, Cargo), many DUKWs were made surplus and used as rescue vehicles by fire departments and Coast Guard stations.

In 1952, the Soviet Union produced a derivative, the BAV 485, adding a rear loading ramp.  The Zavod imeni Stalina factory built it on the structure of its ZiS-151 truck, and production continued until 1962, with over 2,000 units delivered.

Civilian use

Many were used after WWII by civilian organizations such as the police, fire departments, and rescue units. DUKWs were used for oceanographic research in Northern California, as related by participant Willard Bascom. Drivers learned that DUKWS were capable of surfing large winter Pacific waves, with care (and luck).

The Australian Army lent two DUKWs and crew to Australian National Antarctic Research Expeditions for a 1948 expedition to Macquarie Island. Australian DUKWs were used on Antarctic supply voyages until 1970. From 1945 to 1965, the Australian Commonwealth Lighthouse Service supply ship Cape York carried ex-Army DUKWs for supplying lighthouses on remote islands.

One DUKW is in use by the Technisches Hilfswerk (THW) of Germersheim in Germany,  a civil protection organisation.

Tourist attractions

DUKWs are still in use as tourist transport in harbor and river cities across the globe. The first "duck tour" company was started in 1946 by Mel Flath in Wisconsin Dells, Wisconsin. The company is still in operation under the name Original Wisconsin Ducks.

See also

 Ford GPA, 4 wheel amphibious jeep
 GAZ-46
 LARC-V
 Landing Vehicle Tracked, tracked supply and combat amphibious vehicle
 List of U.S. military vehicles by supply catalog designation
 Landwasserschlepper
 PTS
 ZiS-485
 Terrapin (amphibious vehicle), a British equivalent vehicle
 Su-Ki. a Japanese equivalent vehicle

References

Technical Manuals 
 
 
 
 
 TM 9-1825A
 TM 9-1826C
 TM 9-1827B
 TM 9-1827C
 TM 9-1828A
 TM 9-1829A

External links

Marine Corps DUKWs in World War II
Sparkman & Stephens: the company at which Rod Stephens Jr., one of the DUKW's designers, worked (see also this photo with explanatory caption, on the S&S site)
Lace and DUKWs ... both part of the Speir Family legacy, several photos, statistics, and a few details of Speir's tire inflation system from his son Dean Speir
DUKW: its operation and uses

GMC vehicles
Amphibious military vehicles
Amphibious vehicles of World War II
Soft-skinned vehicles
Landing craft
World War II military vehicles
World War II vehicles of Australia
World War II vehicles of the United States
Motor vehicles manufactured in the United States
Wheeled amphibious vehicles
Vehicles introduced in 1942
Military vehicles introduced from 1940 to 1944